Salili is a village on Siau Island in the Sitaro Islands Regency, North Sulawesi Province, Indonesia. 600 meters from the village is the site of an Indonesian government seismic and volcano observation post (Volcanological Survey of Indonesia). The village is located on the slope of Mount Karangetang, south-west of the peak, beside the stream known as Salu Salili.

Notes

Populated places in North Sulawesi